Iago is a 2009 Italian teen drama film directed by Volfango De Biasi.

Cast
Nicolas Vaporidis as Iago
Laura Chiatti as Desdemona
Giulia Steigerwalt as Emilia
Gabriele Lavia as Brabanzio
Aurélien Gaya as Otello
Fabio Ghidoni as Cassio
Lorenzo Gleijeses as Roderigo
Dina Braschi as Maria
Luana Rossetti as Bianca, Roderigo's sister
Francesca Lukasik as Deborah

References

External links

2009 films
Films based on Othello
Films directed by Volfango De Biasi
2000s Italian-language films
2009 drama films
Italian drama films
2000s Italian films